Luc-Marie Chatel (born on 15 August 1964 in Bethesda, Maryland, USA) is a French politician of the Republicans (LR) who served as Minister of National Education in the government of Prime Minister François Fillon from June 2009 to May 2012. In 2014, he served as the acting chair of the Union for a Popular Movement (UMP).

Also, Chatel served as the Secretary of state for Consumer Affairs and Tourism from June 2007 to March 2008, and Government's Spokesman from June 2009 until November 2010.

Political career

Governmental functions

 Minister of National Education, Youth and Voluntary : 2010–2012.
 Minister of National Education, government's spokesman : 2009–2010.
 Secretary of State for Industry and Consumer Affairs, government's spokesman : 2008–2009.
 Secretary of State for Consumer Affairs and Tourism : 2007–2008.

Electoral mandates

National Assembly of France

 Member of the National Assembly of France for Haute-Marne (1st constituency) : 2002-2007 (Became Secretary of State in 2007) / 2012–2017. Elected in 2002, reelected in 2007, 2012.

Regional Council

 Vice-president of the Regional Council of Champagne-Ardenne : 1998–2004.
 Regional councillor of Champagne-Ardenne : 1998–2010. Reelected in 2004.

Municipal Council

 Mayor of Chaumont : 2008-2013 (Resignation).
 Municipal councillor of Chaumont : 1996-2002 (Resignation). 2008–2014. Reelected in 2001, 2008.
 Municipal councillor of Bayard-sur-Marne : 1993–1995.

Community of Communes Council

 President of the Communes Community of the Pays chaumontais : 200–2014.
 Member of the Communes Community of the Pays chaumontais : 2008–2014.

Political function

 Spokesman of the Union for a Popular Movement : 2002–2007.

Political positions
Within the UMP, Chatel initially was part of Les Réformateurs, the party’s liberal wing.

From August 2012, Chatel – alongside Jean-Pierre Raffarin, Jean Leonetti and Marc Laffineur – led Modern and Humanist France (France moderne et humaniste), a recognized movement within the UMP. In the UMP's 2012 leadership election, he endorsed Jean-François Copé.

Ahead of the Republicans’ 2016 primaries, Chatel endorsed Nicolas Sarkozy as the party’s candidate for 2017 presidential elections.

References

External links
 Official biography at the Government of France

1964 births
Living people
People from Montgomery County, Maryland
Liberal Democracy (France) politicians
The Republicans (France) politicians
Modern and Humanist France
French Ministers of National Education
Secretaries of State of France
Government spokespersons of France
Mayors of places in Grand Est
Deputies of the 13th National Assembly of the French Fifth Republic
Deputies of the 14th National Assembly of the French Fifth Republic
Commandeurs of the Ordre des Palmes Académiques
Chevaliers of the Légion d'honneur
Grand Crosses 1st class of the Order of Merit of the Federal Republic of Germany